The following is a list of Catalan exonyms, that is to say, names for places out of Catalan speaking areas which are used in the Catalan language.

Albania

Algeria

Austria

Azerbaijan

Bangladesh

Belgium

Brazil

Canada

Chile

China

Croatia

Cuba

Cyprus

Czech Republic

Denmark

Egypt

Finland

France

Germany

Greece

India

Iran

Iraq

Ireland

Israel

Italy

Japan

Lebanon

Lithuania

Libya

Luxembourg

Mexico

Mongolia

Morocco

Nepal

Netherlands

Poland

Romania

Russia

Saudi Arabia

Serbia

South Korea

Spain

Sweden

Switzerland

Syria

Thailand

Turkey

Ukraine

United Kingdom

United States of America

Uzbekistan

Yemen

See also 
 List of European exonyms

Exonyms
Lists of exonyms